Canefield is a town located on the west coast of Dominica, north of Roseau and south of Massacre, overlooking Pringle's Bay. 
The largest settlement in St. Paul Parish, it has a population of 2,803. It is home to an industrial estate with Harris Paints Dominica Ltd.,  a branch of the Jehovah's Witnesses, as well as the island's second airport. Neighbouring locales include Cochrane, Checkhall, Massacre and Fond Colé.

References

External links
Photos from Canefield

Populated places in Dominica
Saint Paul Parish, Dominica